Villamalur is a municipality in the comarca of Alto Mijares, province of Castellón, Valencian Community, southern Spain.

Sights include the castle, with an irregularly polygonal plan (10th–13th century)

History
The origins of the town are unknown, although it has been supposed  that it grew around the Moorish castle located nearby. In 1236 it was part of the possessions of Zayd Abu Zayd, the last Almohad governor of Valencia. Later it was a center of the  Moriscos, but after their suppression it was repopulated by people from Castile during the first half of the 17th century.

References

Municipalities in the Province of Castellón
Alto Mijares